Valerietta is a genus of moths of the family Noctuidae.

Species
 Valerietta boursini de Freina & Hacker, 1985
 Valerietta bulgarica (Drenowski, 1953)

References
Natural History Museum Lepidoptera genus database
Valerietta at funet

Cuculliinae